Shem-Tob ben Isaac Shaprut of Tudela (born at Tudela in the middle of the 14th century) was a Spanish Jewish philosopher, physician, and polemicist. He is often confused with the physician Shem-Tob ben Isaac of Tortosa, who lived earlier. He may also be confused with another Ibn Shaprut, Hasdai Ibn Shaprut, who corresponded with the king of the Khazars in the 900's.

Life
While still a young man he was compelled to debate in public, on original sin and redemption, with Cardinal Pedro de Luna, afterward Antipope Benedict XIII. This disputation took place in Pamplona, December 26, 1375, in the presence of bishops and learned theologians (see his "Eben Boḥan"; an extract, entitled "Wikkuaḥ" in manuscript, is in the Bibliothèque Nationale, Paris, No. 831). 

A devastating war which raged in Navarre between the Castilians and the English obliged Ibn Shaprut, with many others, to leave the country. He settled at Tarazona, in Aragon, where he practised his profession of physician among both Jews and Christians. As a Talmudic scholar he carried on a correspondence with Sheshet.

Works and editions

The Touchstone
At Tarazona he completed his Eben Boḥan (May, 1380 or 1385), a polemical work against baptized Jews. As a model and guide for this work, which consists of fourteen chapters, or "gates," and is written in the form of a dialogue, he took the polemical Sefer Milḥamot Adonai of Jacob ben Reuben, falsely attributed to David Ḳimḥi. Ibn Shaprut's work, however, is not a partial reproduction of the Milḥamot, as has been incorrectly stated ("Oẓar Neḥmad," ii. 32); it is rather an extension or continuation of it, since it goes into details which are either not mentioned, or are mentioned only briefly, in the other. In the fifteenth chapter, which Ibn Shaprut added later, he criticizes a work written by Alfonso de Valladolid against Jacob ben Reuben. The thirteenth chapter contains a very interesting fragment by a 14th-century Schopenhauer, who wrote under the pseudonym "Lamas" ("Samael"). The Eben Boḥan has been preserved in several manuscripts. 

As part of The Touchstone in order to assist the Jews in defense against conversion and polemical writings, Ibn Shaprut edited or translated portions of the Four Gospels into Hebrew, accompanying them with pointed observations; answers to the latter, written by a neophyte named Jona, also exist in manuscript.

En Kol
Ibn Shaprut wrote a commentary to the first book of Avicenna's canon entitled "En Kol," on music for which he probably made use of the Hebrew translation of Sulaiman ibn Yaish and that of Allorqui, which later he criticizes severely.

The Exposer of Mysteries
He also wrote a super commentary, entitled "Ẓafnat Pa'aneaḥ," to Ibn Ezra's commentary on the Pentateuch (see M. Friedländer in the "Publications of the Society of Hebrew Literature," series ii., vol. iv., p. 221, where " Shem-Ṭob ben Joseph Shaprut of Toledo" should read "Shem-Ṭob ben Isaac of Tudela").

The Orchard of Pomegranates
One work of Ibn Shaprut has been printed: "Pardes Rimmonim," ( פרדס רימונים  ) The Orchard of Pomegranates explanations of difficult Talmudic aggadot (Sabbionetta, 1554)

"Shem Tob's Hebrew Gospel of Matthew"
Shem-Tob's Hebrew Gospel of Matthew is not a separate translation, and almost certainly not actually by Ibn Shaprut himself, but a complete commentary, in Hebrew, on the gospel of Matthew found in The Touchstone (Eben Bohan). On the basis that it probably constitutes an earlier independent text, it has been excised and edited as a separate edition by George Howard (2nd Ed. 1995), Hebrew Gospel of Matthew

In 1879 the German orientalist Adolf Herbst published two other Jewish Hebrew translations of Matthew, also used by Italian and Spanish Jews to combat attempts to conversion, as Des Schemtob ben Schaphrut hebraeische Übersetzung des Evangeliums Matthaei nach den Drucken des S. Münster und J. du Tillet-Mercier neu herausgegeben.(Göttingen, 1879). However these two manuscripts have no direct connection to Ibn Shaprut. They are a Spanish manuscript published and heavily edited by the cartographer Sebastian Münster (and now lost) and a related (surviving) Italian Jewish manuscript purchased by Bishop Jean du Tillet and published by the Hebraist Jean Mercier (1555).

Notes

References
Moritz Steinschneider, Cat. Bodl. cols. 2548-2557;
idem, Hebr. Bibl. xv. 82, xix. 43;
Idem, Hebr. Uebers. pp. 689 et seq.;
Eliakim Carmoly, Histoire des Médecins Juifs, p. 101;
Giovanni Bernardo De Rossi-C. H. Hamberger, Hist. Wörterb. p. 301;
Graziadio Nepi-Mordecai Ghirondi, Toledot Gedole Yisrael, p. 352;
Grätz, Gesch. viii. 23 et seq.;
Isidore Loeb, La Controverse Religieuse, in Revue de l'Histoire des Religions, xviii. 145 et seq.;
idem, in R. E. J. xviii. 219 et seq. (with several extracts according to the Breslau MS.);
Julius Fürst, Bibl. Jud. iii. 259 et seq. (where Ibn Shaprut is confounded with Shem-Ṭob ben Isaac of Tortosa)

Bibliography 
 José-Vicente Niclós: Šem t.ob ibn Šaprut. «La piedra de toque» (Eben Bohan). Una obra de controversia judeo-cristiana. Introducción, edición crítica, traducción y notas al libro I. Bibliotheca Hispana Bíblica 16. Madrid 1997.

External links
  jewishencyclopedia.com Source

Richard Gottheil Meyer Kayserling 

Year of birth unknown
Year of death unknown
14th-century Sephardi Jews
Jewish apologists
Jewish philosophers
Jewish translators of the Bible
Jewish–Christian debate
Medieval Jewish physicians of Spain
Medieval Navarrese Jews
People from Toledo, Spain
Talmudists
Translators of the New Testament into Hebrew